Fabrício Ruan Rocha Farias (born 8 May 2000) is a Brazilian badminton player from Joca Claudino Esportes badminton club. He won the bronze medals at the 2019 Pan American Games in the men's doubles with his brother, Francielton Farias, and also in the mixed doubles with Jaqueline Lima.

Farias and Lima were also the silver medalists in mixed doubles at the 2019 Pan Am Badminton Championships. Farias is a former Pan Am Junior champion in the boys' doubles.

Achievements

Pan American Games 
Men's doubles

Mixed doubles

Pan Am Championships 
Mixed doubles

Pan Am Junior Championships 
Boys' doubles

Mixed doubles

BWF International Challenge/Series (16 titles, 7 runners-up) 
Men's singles

Men's doubles

Mixed doubles

  BWF International Challenge tournament
  BWF International Series tournament
  BWF Future Series tournament

References

External links 
 
 Confederação Brasileira de Badminton Atleta

2000 births
Living people
People from Teresina
Brazilian male badminton players
Badminton players at the 2018 Summer Youth Olympics
Badminton players at the 2019 Pan American Games
Pan American Games bronze medalists for Brazil
Pan American Games medalists in badminton
Medalists at the 2019 Pan American Games
21st-century Brazilian people